Assystem is an independent engineering group based in Paris. It provides services in the design, construction supervision, commissioning and operation of a client's industrial infrastructure. It had revenues of over €470M in 2020, down from €871.4M in 2013. It had over 7100 employees as of 2021, down from over 11,000 in 2013.

References

External links
 https://www.assystem.com/en/ 
 Corporate webpage (en)
 Profile on Google Finance.It has other filial as ATENA
 City Car at YouTube
 City Car at the 2008 Geneva motor show

Engineering companies of France
Companies based in Paris
Construction and civil engineering companies established in 1966
French companies established in 1966